Zozymodes is a genus of crabs in the family Xanthidae, containing the following species:

 Zozymodes cavipes (Dana, 1852)
 Zozymodes nodosus Klunzinger, 1913
 Zozymodes pumilus (Hombron & Jacquinot, 1846)
 Zozymodes xanthoides (Krauss, 1843)

References

Xanthoidea